Engleheart is a surname. Notable people with the surname include:

 Francis Engleheart (1775-1849), engraver
 George Engleheart (1752–1829), English miniature painter
 Henry William Engleheart (1863–1939), English recipient of the Victoria Cross
 John Cox Dillman Engleheart (1784–1862), miniature painter

See also
 Englehart (disambiguation)